Anthony Alexander Poshepny (September 18, 1924 – June 27, 2003), known as Tony Poe, was a CIA  Paramilitary Operations Officer in what became the Special Activities Division (renamed Special Activities Center in 2016). He was known for his service in Laos with Special Guerilla Units (SGUs) under the command of General Vang Pao, a U.S.-funded secret army in Laos during the Vietnam War, and is recognized as the model for Colonel Kurtz in the movie Apocalypse Now.

Early life and career
Poshepny was born in Long Beach, California, to John Charles and Isabel M. ( Veriziano) Poshepny. His father was a United States Navy officer whose parents were immigrants from Bohemia. His mother was born in Guam. When he was eight years old, his nine-year-old brother John accidentally shot her in the stomach with the family rifle, and she nearly bled to death.

Shortly after turning 18, he enlisted in the United States Marine Corps during World War II, serving in the 2nd Marine Parachute Battalion and fighting in the 5th Marine Division on Iwo Jima. 

He received the Purple Heart twice and was a sergeant by the time he was honorably discharged. Returning to civilian life, he enrolled at Saint Mary's College, before transferring to what is now San Jose State University. He contemplated going to work for the FBI. Graduating in 1950, he instead joined the CIA, where he was part of the first recruit class to receive all of its training at the new Camp Peary. He was active in Korea during the Korean War, training refugees for sabotage missions behind communist lines. He also helped train Chinese Nationalist commandos for missions on the mainland.

Following the Korean war, Poshepny joined the Bangkok-based CIA front company Overseas Southeast Asia Supply (SEA Supply), which provided military equipment to Kuomintang forces based in Burma. In 1958, Poshepny tried unsuccessfully to arrange a military uprising against Sukarno, the president of Indonesia. From 1958 to 1960, he trained different special missions teams, including Tibetan Khampas and Hui Muslims at Camp Hale for operations inside China against the Communist government. Carole McGranahan quotes Poe from an interview that the Tibetans he trained "... were the best I ever worked with."

Laos
The CIA was impressed by Poshepny's ability to train paramilitary forces quickly and awarded him the Intelligence Star in 1959. Two years later, working under Bill Lair, he was assigned with J. Vinton Lawrence to train Hmong hill tribes in Laos to fight the North Vietnamese and Pathet Lao forces which were then trying to take over that country. Poshepny gained the respect of the Hmong forces with practices that were considered barbaric by agency standards. He paid Hmong fighters to bring him the ears of dead enemy soldiers, and on at least one occasion mailed a bag of ears to the U.S. Embassy in Vientiane to verify his body counts. He dropped severed heads onto enemy locations twice in a grisly form of psy-ops. Though his orders again were only to train forces, he repeatedly went into battle with them and was wounded several times by shrapnel.

Over the years, Poshepny became disillusioned with the U.S. government's management of the war. The CIA extracted Poshepny from Laos in 1970 and assigned him to a training camp in Thailand until his retirement in 1974. He received another Intelligence Star in 1975.

Retirement
After the United States withdrew from Vietnam, Poshepny remained in Thailand with his Hmong wife and four children. He moved the family to California in the 1990s. He frequently appeared at Hmong veterans' gatherings and helped veterans immigrate and settle in the US. He freely admitted his controversial acts during the war to reporters and historians, saying they were a necessary response to Communist aggression.

A number of press stories have implied that Poshepny was the model for Colonel Walter Kurtz in the film Apocalypse Now. Tony Poe and his colleagues from the CIA, including Jerry Daniels, pushed for a memorial to the Hmong that fought with the United States in Laos and were successful. That memorial was established in Arlington National Cemetery on Memorial Day of 2018.

A new section devoted to Tony Poe is now being displayed at the Patpong Museum in Bangkok, Thailand.

See also
Kingdom of Laos
North Vietnamese invasion of Laos
Hmong people
Lao Veterans of America
Laos Memorial
Vang Pao
Air America
Royal Lao Army

References

Declassified reading
CIA and the Generals , Covert Support to Military Government in South Vietnam
CIA and the House of Ngo,  Covert Action in South Vietnam, 1954–63
CIA and Rural Pacification
Good Questions, Wrong Answers  CIA's Estimates of Arms Traffic through Sihanoukville, Cambodia, During the Vietnam War.
The Way We Do Things , Black Entry Operations into Northern Vietnam
Undercover Armies,  CIA and Surrogate Warfare in Laos

Further reading

 Vietnam Magazine, August 2006
 Tony Poe biography from Patpong Museum

1924 births
2003 deaths
United States Marine Corps personnel of World War II
People of the Central Intelligence Agency
CIA personnel of the Vietnam War
American people of the Korean War
United States Marines
Recipients of the Silver Star
Recipients of the Intelligence Star
People of the Laotian Civil War
Saint Mary's College of California alumni
San Jose State University alumni
American expatriates in Thailand
American expatriates in Laos